Buneh Rizak-e Chenar (also Romanized as Būneh Rīzak-e Chenār; also known as Būneh Rīzak) is a village in Chenar Rural District, Kabgian District, Dana County, Kohgiluyeh and Boyer-Ahmad Province, Iran. As of the 2006 census, its population was 41, with there being 9 families.

References 

Populated places in Dana County